BlueCross BlueShield of South Carolina (BlueCross) is an independent licensee of the Blue Cross and Blue Shield Association. BlueCross serves 21.5 million people through private business and government contracts.

BlueCross has several subsidiaries, two of which are affiliates licensed with the Blue Cross and Blue Shield Association. Licensed subsidiaries include BlueCross BlueShield of South Carolina Foundation and BlueChoice HealthPlan. Non-licensed affiliates include Companion Captive Insurance Company, Companion Life, PGBA, LLC, Planned Administrators, Inc. (PAI) and TCC of South Carolina.

History
BlueCross began as the South Carolina Hospital Service Plan, later becoming BlueCross of South Carolina (BlueCross), when the General Assembly passed legislation bringing this group into existence. In the spring of 1947, the South Carolina Hospital Service Plan merged with the Hospital Benefit Association of Greenville, giving them a financial base. In 1971, BlueShield of South Carolina merged with BlueCross to form the current company.

In July 2020, BlueCross BlueShield of South Carolina and the BlueCross BlueShield of South Carolina Foundation joined several organizations well-established in the trenches of diabetes care, including the Alliance for a Healthier South Carolina and the state's Department of Health and Environmental Control, to launch Diabetes Free SC, a long-term, multi-million dollar, statewide initiative dedicated to addressing these disparities in care in three strategic directions: improved pregnancy outcomes in women with diabetes; reduced lifelong risk of diabetes in children; and the prevention of diabetes and its complications in adults. The BlueCross Foundation awarded $11.6 million in three- to-five year grants to Prisma Health, the Medical University of South Carolina (MUSC), the Alliance for a Healthier Generation and FoodShareSC to support efforts in each of these categories.

BlueChoice HealthPlan 
BlueChoice HealthPlan was founded in 1984, originally as Companion HealthCare, and was the first health maintenance organization (HMO) offered by BlueCross BlueShield of South Carolina. To date, BlueChoice HealthPlan has nearly 200,000 members.

In 2008 the HMO added a Medicaid option called BlueChoice HealthPlan Medicaid for eligible South Carolinians.

In 2013, A.M. Best affirmed BlueChoice HealthPlan's A+ (Superior) financial strength rating as part of the group rating for BCBSSC.

Coronavirus Pandemic 
BlueCross BlueShield of South Carolina decided to waive all out-of-pockets fees of the members for COVID-19 related treatments.

References

External links
BlueCross BlueShield of South Carolina
BlueCross BlueShield of South Carolina Foundation
BlueChoice HealthPlan of South Carolina
BlueChoice HealthPlan Medicaid
USC and IBM partnership

American companies established in 1946
Financial services companies established in 1946
Insurance companies of the United States
Health care companies based in South Carolina
Companies based in Columbia, South Carolina
1946 establishments in South Carolina
Members of Blue Cross Blue Shield Association
Financial services companies of the United States